is a former Japanese football player.

Playing career
Ishihara was born in Nirasaki on 2 October 1978. After graduating from Juntendo University, he joined his local J2 League club Ventforet Kofu in 2001. He became a regular player as midfielder from first season and played many matches for a long time. Although Ventforet was at the bottom place in 2001 season, the club results moved up from 2002. In 2005, he played all 44 matches and Ventforet won the 3rd place and was promoted to J1 League first time in the club history. In J1 from 2006 season, he played all matches except 1 match for suspension in 2 seasons. However the club results were bad and was relegated to J2 end of 2007 season. After that, Ventforet repeated relegation to J2 and promotion to J1. Although he played as regular player until 2009, his opportunity to play decreased from 2010. Although Ventforet stayed in J1 from 2013, he could not play many matches except 2014 season. Ventforet was relegated to J2 end of 2017 season. Ishihara also could hardly play in the match in 2017 and retired end of 2017 season.

Club statistics

References

External links

1978 births
Living people
Juntendo University alumni
Association football people from Yamanashi Prefecture
Japanese footballers
J1 League players
J2 League players
Ventforet Kofu players
Association football midfielders